Lyle Hilton Smith (March 17, 1916 – July 26, 2017) was an American football and basketball player, coach, and college athletics administrator.

Smith was also the head basketball coach at BJC for one season in 1946–47, tallying a mark of 24–9, and the school athletic director from 1968 to 1981. Boise was a junior college program during Smith's coaching career; it moved up to four-year status in the NAIA in 1968, NCAA Division II in 1970, Division I-AA in 1978, and Division I-A in 1996.

Early life and playing career
Born in Steptoe, Washington, to Burrell F. and Addie (Humphrey) Smith, Smith's father and older brothers were ranchers. Raised on the Palouse in Steptoe and Moscow, Idaho, Smith graduated from Moscow High School in 1934, after leading the Bears to consecutive state titles in  He initially attended the University of Idaho's Southern Branch in Pocatello—now Idaho State University— for a year and then returned to his hometown to attend the University of Idaho, where he was a two-sport athlete for the Vandals, a center on the football team under head coach Ted Bank, and a guard on the basketball team, coached by Forrest Twogood. His teammates at Idaho included future coaches Steve Belko and Tony Knap.

During Smith's senior football season of 1938, the team went  the Vandals' best record in over a decade; Idaho's last winning season in football for a quarter century and the best until 1971. The Vandals broke to an early  start and there was early talk of the Rose Bowl in the national press. Smith received a bachelor's degree in education in 1939 and embarked on a teaching career.

Military service and coaching career
Smith taught and coached for a year at Firth High School in southeastern Idaho, then married fellow 1939 UI graduate Maria Raphael of Weiser in 1940 and returned to Moscow to work in private employment in auto sales. He became head coach at Moscow High School in the spring  when Babe Brown crossed town to coach the Vandal freshmen. Smith entered the U.S. Navy in June 1942 during World War II.

Smith served primarily as a physical training instructor, and returned to Moscow and completed his master's degree in education in 1946. He was to return to the high school as head coach, but resigned in August to accept an offer to be an assistant football coach at Boise Junior College, and became its head coach the following year. Riding a 31-game winning streak in 1950, the team moved into a new 10,000-seat stadium. With the outbreak of the Korean War, Smith missed all but the first three games of the 1950 season and the entire 1951 season due to military duty. He returned in 1952 and was a leading candidate for the vacant job at his alma mater Idaho in 1954, but withdrew his name from consideration, content at Boise. Boise won thirteen conference titles in football under Smith and the NJCAA National Football Championship in 1958.

Administrative career and honors
Smith stepped down as head coach and became the school's first full-time athletic director in November 1967; the Broncos began competition as a four-year school in 1968. He hired former Vandal teammate Tony Knap as head coach in December, and Knap's successor Jim Criner in 1976. Smith continued as head baseball coach through the 1973 season, then was succeeded by Ross Vaughn, a Ph.D. candidate in biomechanics and assistant coach at Washington State.

Smith retired at age 65 in July 1981, succeeded by Mike Mullally of Cal State-Fullerton. After just months on the job, Mullally resigned under pressure after a backlash at his new priority seating policy. He was replaced in March 1982 by assistant Gene Bleymaier, who stayed for nearly three decades. Smith was a key advisor during Bleymaier's first years as director.

At the final regular season home game before his retirement as athletic director, the playing field at Bronco Stadium was dedicated in Smith's honor on November 8, 1980. Boise State won the game over Nevada to secure the conference title and one of the four Division I-AA playoff berths in December. BSU won the opening-round semifinal over Grambling in Boise on "Lyle Smith Field" and the national title in Sacramento over defending champion Eastern Kentucky. Smith turned 100 in March 2016, and died in July 2017 at age 101.

Head coaching record

Football

^Smith was head coach for the first three games of the 1950 season before being recalled to the Navy during the Korean War. George Blankley coached the remainder of the 1950 season.

References

External links

1916 births
2017 deaths
American centenarians
American football centers
Guards (basketball)
Boise State Broncos athletic directors
Boise State Broncos football coaches
Boise State Broncos men's basketball coaches
Idaho Vandals football players
Idaho Vandals men's basketball players
United States Navy personnel of World War II
Basketball coaches from Idaho
United States Navy personnel of the Korean War
People from Moscow, Idaho
People from Whitman County, Washington
Players of American football from Idaho
Military personnel from Idaho
American men's basketball players
Boise State Broncos baseball coaches
United States Navy officers
Men centenarians